Sungai Buloh Highway or Jalan Sungai Buloh, Federal Route 54, is a major highway in Klang Valley region, Selangor state, Malaysia. The highway has now been upgraded into six-lane carriageway on 22 June 2007.

History
The highway was upgraded by the Malaysian Public Works Department (JKR) and the two main contractor, Melati Ehsan Holdings Berhad and Desa Purnama Sdn Bhd on 22 June 2007.

The project involved upgrading and expanding the Federal Road 54, this connects to Jalan Kepong, Damansara–Puchong Expressway and to various residential areas at Sungai Buloh, Selangor such as Sierramas, Damansara Damai, and Bandar Sri Damansara. The project involves the construction of new bridges, road upgrades, drainage and utility relocation and two new interchanges.

The Federal Route 54 Upgrading Project is part of the Northern Kuala Lumpur Traffic Dispersal System implemented by the Federal Government to alleviate the chronic traffic congestion along the route. The area surrounding and straddling this section of the route have witnessed rapid growths both in terms of population and traffic.

The project has been divided into two packages with 'Package 1', awarded to Konsortium Melati Ehsan – Desa Purnama. Package 1 involves upgrading a four-km section of Federal Route 54 between the Damansara–Puchong Expressway (LDP) Interchange near Bandar Sri Damansara and the Sungai Buloh-NSE Toll Plaza of the North–South Expressway Northern Route.

Scope of work
The scope of work involved can be summarized as follows:
 Construction of a three-lane dual carriageway road, including drainage, geotechnical works and construction of four bridges including:
 Elevated U-Turn West Bound and U-Turn East Bound.
 Directional Ramps from Damansara Damai.
 Bridge over Sungai Buloh at Kampung Desa Aman.
 Landscaping, road furniture and street lighting at specified locations.
 Relocation of public utilities and services where required.

List of interchanges

Highways in Malaysia
Expressways and highways in the Klang Valley